Campodea is a genus of small, white, bristle-tailed arthropods in the order Diplura. The best known species, Campodea staphylinus, has a wide distribution across much of Europe. It lives in damp places under stones, fallen trees, or in rotten wood and leaves. Although blind, it immediately crawls away on exposure to the light into the nearest crevice or other sheltered spot, feeling the way with its antennae. There are at least 130 described species in Campodea.

See also
 List of Campodea species

References

Further reading
Fauna Europaea entry for Campodea. Retrieved January 26, 2006.
Fauna Europaea entry for Campodea staphylinus. Retrieved January 26, 2006.
Nomina Insecta Nearctica

External links

 

Diplura